The following highways are numbered 29A:

United States
 County Road 29A (Collier County, Florida)
 New Jersey Route 29A (former)
 County Route 29A (Monmouth County, New Jersey)
 New York State Route 29A
 Oklahoma State Highway 29A
Tennessee State Route 29A (former, now Tennessee State Route 328)